Schwalb is a surname. Notable people with the name include:

Fernando Schwalb López Aldana (1916–2002), Prime Minister of Peru
Martin Schwalb (born 1963), German handball player
Robert J. Schwalb, American game designer
Susan Schwalb (born 1944), American painter

See also
Schwab (surname)